{{DISPLAYTITLE:C30H52}}
The molecular formula C30H52 may refer to:

 Arborane
 Cycloartane
 Dammarene
 Fernane
 Gammacerane
 Gorgostane
 Hopane
 Lupane (compound)
 Neohopane
 Oleanane
 Ursane